Selovec ( or ) is a dispersed settlement in the hills south of Dravograd in the Carinthia region in northern Slovenia.

Mass graves
Selovec is the site of three known mass graves or unmarked graves associated with the Second World War. It is a clearly visible mound containing the remains of two soldiers: a Croatian and a Cossack. It contains the remains of five to 12 Croatian soldiers. It contains the remains of one Croatian soldier.

References

External links
Selovec on Geopedia

Populated places in the Municipality of Dravograd